Rodolfo Aníbal Frigeri (1 April 1941 – 2 October 2015) was an Argentine economist and politician. He served as the Minister of Economy and Public Finances from December 23, 2001, to December 30, 2001, during the brief administration of President Adolfo Rodríguez Saá under the title "Minister of the Treasury, Finance and Public Revenue."

Frigeria was born in Banfield, Buenos Aires, the son of José Manuel María Frigeri and Livia Oddera. Frigeri received a bachelor's degree in public economics from the University of Buenos Aires in 1970. He became Minister of Finance of Mendoza Province in 1975 during Antonio Cafiero's administration of the province.

Frigeri later became the Minister of the Economy of Buenos Aires Province from 1987 to July 1989, also under Cafiero, who had become Governor of Buenos Aires Province. In July 1989, Frigeri joined the staff of the Department of the Treasury at the beginning of President Carlos Menem's administration.

Frigeri became the President of the Bank of the Province of Buenos Aires (Bapro) in 1991. He later became the chairman of Grupo Bapro and served as a deputy in the Argentine Chamber of Deputies from 1997 to 2005.

Rodolfo Frigeri died on October 3, 2015, at the age of 73.

References

1941 births
2015 deaths
Argentine Ministers of Finance
Members of the Argentine Chamber of Deputies elected in Buenos Aires Province
Argentine economists
Justicialist Party politicians
University of Buenos Aires alumni
Argentine people of Italian descent
Politicians from Buenos Aires
People from Mendoza Province